Perdix is a genus of partridges with representatives in most of temperate Europe and Asia.

Perdix may also refer to:
Perdix (mythology), nephew of Daedalus in Greek mythology
Moexipril, a drug sold under the trade name Perdix
Perdix (drone), an American unmanned aerial vehicle